William Franklyn Wolff (January 14, 1876 – November 7, 1943), was a professional baseball pitcher. He pitched in one game in Major League Baseball for the Philadelphia Phillies of the National League on September 10, 1902.

External links

Major League Baseball pitchers
Philadelphia Phillies players
Baseball players from Pennsylvania
1876 births
1943 deaths